Walter Franklin Whitman (August 15, 1924 – February 6, 1994) was a shortstop in Major League Baseball who played for the Chicago White Sox in parts of two seasons. Hooker, as he was dubbed, appeared in 20 games for the Sox in their 1946 and 1948 seasons.

External links
, or Retrosheet

1924 births
1994 deaths
Baseball players from Indiana
Chicago White Sox players
Cornell Big Red baseball players
Danville-Schoolfield Leafs players
Des Moines Bruins players
Fall River Indians players
Greensboro Red Sox players
Los Angeles Angels (minor league) players
Major League Baseball shortstops
Memphis Chickasaws players
Muskegon Clippers players
People from Crawford County, Indiana
Thomasville Tommies players
Waterloo White Hawks players
People from Maryville, Illinois